A legislative correspondent is a position in the congressional staff employed by members of the United States Congress that is chiefly responsible for drafting constituent form letters and memoranda, tracking legislation, conducting legislative research, and meeting constituent and interest groups. As of 2019, the average pay of a legislative correspondent was $45,457.

Notable former legislative correspondents include Jon Ossoff, Ben Cline, Joshua DuBois, and Stacey Plaskett.

References

Legislative staff